Tyce Thompson (born July 12, 1999) is an American professional ice hockey center for the Utica Comets of the American Hockey League (AHL) as a prospect to the New Jersey Devils of the National Hockey League (NHL).

Playing career
Tyce Thompson attended the prestigious Salisbury School and won two New England Championships, afterwards he continued his successes at Providence College. Tyce was drafted by the New Jersey Devils in the 4th round (96th overall) in the 2019 NHL Entry Draft.

On March 24, 2021, Thompson concluded his collegiate career after his junior season and signed his first professional deal and immediately was added to the Devils roster on a two-year, entry-level contract. On April 6, Thompson made his professional and NHL debut, playing against his brother Tage, to register his first career assist and point in a 5–3 loss to the Buffalo Sabres.

Personal life
His father is former NHL player Brent Thompson, who currently coaches the Bridgeport Islanders. His mother is Kimberly Oliver Thompson from Phoenix, Arizona, and his brother Tage Thompson currently plays in the NHL with the Buffalo Sabres.

Career statistics

Awards and honors

References

External links
 

1999 births
Living people
American ice hockey centers
Binghamton Devils players
Dubuque Fighting Saints players
New Jersey Devils draft picks
New Jersey Devils players
People from Oyster Bay (town), New York
Providence Friars men's ice hockey players
Utica Comets players